The 45 class (later the 71 class) was a class of mainline electric locomotive built in-house in 1952 by the New South Wales Department of Railways' Chullora Railway Workshops. With only a single locomotive in the class, 4501 was renumbered 7100 in October 1961, which freed up the number range for the 45-class diesel locomotives.

Construction
The sole member of the class was designed by the New South Wales Department of Railways and was built at their Chullora Railway Workshops using components supplied by Commonwealth Engineering. It was completed in June 1952 and numbered 4501.

Operation

Its maximum speed was  It had a driving compartment at each end of its very box-shaped body. Its colour scheme being bottle green, with chrome lining, it became affectionately known as the Green Beetle.

Its purpose was to provide experience of operating powerful electric locomotives prior to the arrival of the 46 class locomotives which had been ordered from England for use on the electrified Main Western line to Bowenfels. Once the electrification project had reached Penrith in October 1955, 4501 had its first opportunity to haul passenger trains. Six months later, when the first 46-class arrived, the locomotive became a regular assistant locomotive for steam powered trains on the Main North line between North Strathfield and Hornsby.

In 1957, it was transferred to the Flemington Maintenance Depot where it was employed as a shunter. At the time, Flemington was the base for all locomotive hauled air-conditioned carriages.

In October 1961, it was re-numbered 7100. In October 1967, it received a major overhaul where several tonnes of additional ballast was added. Main-line safeworking equipment was provided to allow it to haul coal trains over the newly electrified Main South from Glenlee to Rozelle.

Demise
Failures dogged the veteran locomotive and it was withdrawn in June 1974. Following an extended period of storage, it was placed at the New South Wales Rail Transport Museum (now NSW Rail Museum) moved to Thirlmere. In April 2009, it was relocated to the former Broadmeadow Locomotive Depot. It is now on Transport Asset Holding Entity's heritage list.

References

Further reading

Co-Co locomotives
Electric locomotives of New South Wales
Preserved electric locomotives
Railway locomotives introduced in 1952
Standard gauge locomotives of Australia
1500 V DC locomotives